Presidential elections were held in Niger on 27 February 1993, with a second round on 27 March after no candidate passed the 50% barrier in the first round. They were the first multi-candidate presidential elections held in the country since independence in 1960, following constitutional changes approved in a referendum the previous year.  Although Mamadou Tandja of the ruling National Movement for the Development of Society (which had emerged as the largest party in the parliamentary elections) won the most votes in the first round, he lost in the second round to Mahamane Ousmane of the Democratic and Social Convention party. Voter turnout was only 32.5% in the first round and 35.2% in the second.

Results

References

Niger
1993 in Niger
Presidential elections in Niger